Stigmella alba is a moth of the family Nepticulidae. In North America it has been recorded from Arizona and British Columbia.

External links
A taxonomic revision of the North American species of Stigmella (Lepidoptera: Nepticulidae)

Nepticulidae
Moths of North America
Moths described in 1979